Qaleh-ye Esmaili (also Romanized as Qal‘eh-ye Esmā‘īlī) is a village in Howmeh Rural District, in the Central District of Lamerd County, Fars Province, Iran. At the 2006 census, its population was 78, in 21 families.

References 

Populated places in Lamerd County